Ortalis isara is a species of ulidiid or picture-winged fly in the genus Ortalis of the family Ulidiidae.

References

Ortalis (fly)